Dolores Paterno e Ignacio (March 10, 1854 – July 3, 1881) was a Filipina composer known for the song "La Flor de Manila" (also known as "Sampaguita").

Biography

Dolores Paterno e Ignacio (anglicized as Dolores Paterno-Ignacio) was born on March 10, 1854, in Santa Cruz, Manila, Philippines. She was one of the thirteen children of Máximo Paterno y Agustín Molo and Carmina Ignacio de Vera.

Dolores Paterno came from the wealthy interrelated mestizo de sangley families of Paterno, Molo, and Agustin. She was the sister of Dr. Pedro Alejandro Paterno, a Filipino politician, poet, and novelist. Her sisters and stepsisters, Agueda, Jacoba, Paz, Concepcion, and Adelaida, were celebrated painters and jewelers whose works were exhibited at the Exposición Regional de Filipinas in Manila in 1895 and at the St. Louis World's Fair in 1904. She was also related to the Asuncion brothers, among them Justiniano Asuncion who painted her portrait in 1870.

Musically inclined at a young age, she was sent by her parents to the Santa Isabel College, Manila, an all-girls Catholic school managed by the Daughters of Charity. She devoted much of her time to learning the piano. In 1879, at the age of 25 she composed her only known work, "La Flor de Manila" ('The Flower of Manila'), inspired by the sampaguita flower. The lyrics were by her brother Pedro Paterno, based on a poem of the same title written by their mother.

She died at the age of 27 on July 3, 1881.

La Flor de Manila
"La Flor de Manila" is of the Habanera genre (also known as Contradanza or Danza). It was popular during the end of the 19th century and the early period of the American Commonwealth. It has since been considered a Philippine romantic classic. The lyrics were translated from Spanish into Tagalog by the Filipino National Artist Levi Celerio. An arrangement of the song by Rosendo E. Santos, Jr. was also included in the repertoire of the Harvard Glee Club, during their tour of the Philippines in 1961. It is sung by the Graduating Students of Centro Escolar University during their Annual Sampaguita Interlude as their closing number. The marching band arrangement of it entitled "Sampaguita March" was released in 1974, being performed by Malabon Brass Band. The arrangement is the official inspection march of the Vice President of the Philippines. This was first used as an official inspection march of President Noynoy Aquino from 2010 to 2012. It is currently used as the official inspection march of President Bongbong Marcos and Vice President Sara Duterte.

Earliest lyrics

Translated versions

See also
 Pedro A. Paterno

References

Bibliography
 Camacho (2000). 100 taon, 100 Filipina sa digmaan at sa kapayapaan. Quezon City: Leonarda Navato-Camacho.
 The National Historical Institute (1989). Filipinos in history (vol. 5). Manila: The National Historical Institute.

External links
 in the original Spanish, performed by Guillermo Gómez Rivera
, performed by Michael Dadap

1854 births
1881 deaths
19th century in music
19th-century classical composers
19th-century women composers
Women classical composers
Filipino classical composers
Filipino women composers
History of the Philippines (1565–1898)
People from Santa Cruz, Manila
Romantic composers